Hermann Staiger (6 April 1915 – 22 June 1964) was a Luftwaffe ace and recipient of the Knight's Cross of the Iron Cross during World War II. The Knight's Cross of the Iron Cross was awarded to recognise extreme battlefield bravery or successful military leadership. For the fighter-pilots it was a quantifiable measure of their skill and success. Hermann Staiger was credited with 63 aerial victories during World War II, 49 on the Western Front and 14 on the Eastern Front.

Early life and career
Joining the Luftwaffe in 1935 to start his flight training, by the start of the war in September 1939 he was a Leutnant flying with 1./JG 20 (the 1st squadron of the 20th Fighter Wing). This was a wing in name only, being just a single Gruppe (Fighter Group) that had been set up just prior to the outbreak of war, in July 1939. His Staffelkapitän (Squadron Leader) was the Legion Condor veteran Walter Oesau.

World War II
For the Polish campaign his unit was based at Sprottau, to protect the Silesian industrial area from Polish bombers, but after a week of inactivity it returned to Berlin and then onto Bönninghardt on the Dutch border under the command of Jagdgeschwader 51.

The attack on France in May 1940 was very quiet for JG 51 and I./JG 20 as they quickly cleared the skies over the Low Countries. It was only at the end of that month, when the units transferred to Ghent, in Belgium, for the battle for the beaches of Dunkirk that Staiger opened his scoresheet. He shot down an RAF Spitfire northwest of that city on 31 May, among the dozen claims by the Gruppe that day.

Soon after his second victory (a Blenheim bomber on 30 June), the relationship between JG 51 and I./JG 20 was formalized on 4 July when the latter was renamed III./JG 51 (the third Gruppe of JG 51), and Staiger's squadron became 7./JG 51. He was reasonably successful in the ensuing Battle of Britain shooting down a further seven aircraft. Now an experienced pilot and promoted to Oberleutnant, he was appointed Staffelkapitän of his 7./JG 51 on 25 August when Oesau was himself promoted to Gruppenkommandeur of III./JG 51.

After the invasion was postponed (indefinitely) JG 51 was withdrawn to winter quarters back in the Reich. It would return to the Channel Front for a time in early 1941 although now nominally on the defensive. Staiger still managed to pick up three further victories before the units were sent to the east for the upcoming invasion of the Soviet Union.

Eastern Front
On the opening day of the Operation Barbarossa he shot down three SB-2 bombers. JG 51 was leading the charge eastward racking up a huge number of victories. On 30 June, when JG 51 became the first Geschwader to claim 1000 victories Staiger shot down a further four bombers in the first great encirclement battle, over Minsk. However the combat wasn't all one-sided, and on 15 July he was himself seriously injured when his BF 109F2 (Werk Nummer 8083 - factory number) was hit by Soviet anti-aircraft fire.

While recovering in hospital he was awarded the Knight's Cross on 16 July in recognition of his 25 victories to date. After an extended period of convalescence he served in a number of pilot-training units for the next two years, and was promoted to Hauptmann (Captain) on 1 February 1943. He briefly returned to his old unit, JG 51, at the end of May 1943 before taking up his new combat command as Staffelkapitän of 12./JG 26 on 5 July.

Defence of the Reich
Based back on the Channel Front it was fighting a whole new type of war: In the past year the American 8th USAAF had arrived in Britain and started daylight bombing operations against Germany's industry. The heavily armed four-engined B-17 and B-24 bombers ("Viermots") were very hard to shoot down but Staiger quickly learned his combat technique. Over the next month he accounted for five Viermots, becoming one of the first bomber-aces.

He would go on to survive and become one of the leading anti-bomber pilots. In one of the biggest Luftwaffe success over the 8th USAAF, on 17 August 1943, the combined Schweinfurt-Regensburg mission he claimed a B-17 near Mönchengladbach. On 10 October, in heavy raids on Münster, he shot down his seventh B-17, but this time was wounded by the return fire of the defensive 'boxes' of bombers. For his continuing leadership and 34 victories he was awarded the German Cross in Gold on 29 October.

Further heavy losses caused a pause and re-evaluation of strategy by the Allies, who desperately needed long-range fighter escorts to cover the bomber missions into the Reich. Finally, in December 1943, the balance started to change with the introduction of the P-51B Mustang. As the winter weather cleared, operations picked up again and the Americans launched Operation Argument (Big Week) on 20 February. Over the week Staiger shot down a further three aircraft. March's bombing target was mostly focused on Berlin, and he scored another five Viermots. After his Gruppenkommandeur, Klaus Mietusch, was injured on 8 March, he took up temporary command of III./JG 26 for three weeks in his absence, while still remaining as squadron leader of 12./JG 26 at the same time.

April was to be Staiger's most successful month, claiming 8 aircraft. On 13 April he shot down a 364th Fighter Group Lockheed P-38 Lightning near Bitburg; the American pilots' remains were found in 1996. Five of these were on the 24th. III./JG 26 had been temporarily transferred to Munich, with very little to do except play cards. That morning however, the alarms sounded and the pilots (including Staiger) with only a few hours' sleep, took to the air nursing fearsome hangovers, sucking in the pure oxygen. Flying a heavily armed Me 109 with a 30mm MK108 cannon firing through the spinner, he managed to down 2 bombers in as many minutes, then another plus two Herausschüsse (formation separations) within minutes of each other a half-hour later. In May, a series of devastating raids crippled Germany's oil production, severely limiting flight operations.

On 15 May he was promoted to command of the Fw 190-equipped I./JG 26, while Maj Karl Borris was away. In June all the Allied attention turned to France, and the Normandy invasion (Operation Overlord). Immediately fifteen Gruppen, including Staiger's I./JG 26, were rushed to the west. But, now fighting low-level combats and often up against 20:1 odds, they stood no chance. On 1 August, with Major Borris' return, Staiger transferred to take up command of II/JG 1 which had also been struggling through the French campaign. With the Allied breakout at the start of August, II./JG 1 soon retreated east of the Seine, then a week later back to the Reich to rebuild and re-equip. Indicative of the devastation, in its 10-weeks over Normandy, II./JG 1 had lost 106 aircraft (out of a nominal complement of 68) and 27 pilots killed, for 32 confirmed victories. It would not be fit for action for three months, not re-engaging in combat until 26 November 1944. Staiger led by example, shooting down a B-17.

Although promoted to Major on 1 January 1945, Staiger was not involved in the ill-fated New Year's Day attack (Operation Bodenplatte). He was seconded to III./EJG 2 to get training on the Me262 jet. Staiger was tasked with setting up a new jet Gruppe, and on 12 January 1945 was assigned as Kommandeur of II./JG 7, authorized by renaming IV/JG 54 on 7 February. But with very limited aircraft (and, more particularly, engines) available for the other Gruppen, let alone his, it struggled to get operational. Its first ten aircraft, along with a pair of two-seater trainers, were delivered a week later to allow training to commence. By then Staiger had passed command of II./JG 7 over to Hptm Lutz-Wilhelm Burckhardt. It is uncertain what he did for the remainder of the war, although Forsyth comments that he was a senior pilot still with II./JG 7 in April, although he did not score any victories in the Me 262 jet.

Hermann Staiger survived the war and was one of the very few 'start-to-finishers' to do so. He is credited with 63 combat victories, of which only 14 were over the Eastern Front. His total of 26 Viermot victories ranks him 5th equal in success against this formidable aircraft type - and the most successful Me 109-pilot over the Reich (Werner Schroer's 26 were split over the Mediterranean and Reich theaters). He died, at Freiburg, on 22 June 1964

Awards
 Flugzeugführerabzeichen
 Iron Cross (1939)
 2nd Class
 1st Class
 Front Flying Clasp of the Luftwaffe
 Sudetenland Medal (20 October 1939)
 Knight's Cross of the Iron Cross on 16 July 1941 as Oberleutnant and Staffelkapitän of the 7./Jagdgeschwader 51
 German Cross in Gold on 27 October 1943 as Hauptmann in the 12./Jagdgeschwader 26

References

Citations

Bibliography

 Caldwell, Donald L (1993). 	JG26 – Top Guns of the Luftwaffe. 	Ballantine 	
 
 Forsyth, Robert (2008).  Aviation Elite Units #29: Jagdgeschwader 7 'Nowotny’.	Oxford: Osprey Publishing Ltd.	
 Forsyth, Robert (2011).   Luftwaffe Viermot Aces 1942-45.	Oxford: Osprey Publishing Ltd.	.
 
 
 
 Smith, J.Richard & Creek, Eddie J (2005). Jagdwaffe Vol 5, Sec4: Jet Fighters and Rocket Interceptors 1944 - 1945 	Hersham, Surrey: Ian Allan Publishing   
 
 Weal, John (1995). 	Focke-Wulf Fw190 Aces of the Russian Front. 	Oxford: Osprey Publishing Ltd.	.
 Weal, John (1996). 	Focke-Wulf Fw190 Aces of the Western Front. 	Oxford: Osprey Publishing Ltd.	.
 Weal, John (1999). 	Bf109F/G/K Aces of the Western Front. 	Oxford: Osprey Publishing Ltd.	.
 Weal, John (2006). 	Bf109 Defence of the Reich Aces. 	Oxford: Osprey Publishing Ltd.	.
 Weal, John (2006). 	Aviation Elite Units #22: Jagdgeschwader 51 'Mölders’. 	Oxford: Osprey Publishing Ltd.	.

1915 births
1964 deaths
People from Schramberg
Luftwaffe pilots
German World War II flying aces
Recipients of the Gold German Cross
Recipients of the Knight's Cross of the Iron Cross
People from the Kingdom of Württemberg
Military personnel from Baden-Württemberg